John Louis Chickerneo (March 13, 1917 – October 3, 1995) was an American football player who played one season with the New York Giants of the National Football League. He was drafted by the New York Giants in the third round of the 1939 NFL Draft. He played college football at the University of Pittsburgh and attended Warren G. Harding High School in Warren, Ohio.

References

External links
Just Sports Stats
College stats
John Chickerneo

1917 births
1995 deaths
Players of American football from Gary, Indiana
American football running backs
American football linebackers
Pittsburgh Panthers football players
New York Giants players